License is the fourth studio album by Japanese pop singer Aya Ueto. It was released on March 8, 2006 on Flight Master.

Background
License includes Ueto's previous singles "Yume no Chikara", "Kaze wo Ukete", and "Egao no Mama de." The album took a more adult direction than her previous releases. The last track, "Fermata", was penned by Ueto's brother Makoto. License was released in two formats: limited CD+DVD edition, which includes a DVD featuring the music video and making of "Egao no Mama de" as well as a special interview, and the standard CD only edition.

Chart performance
License peaked at #9 on the Oricon Daily Albums Chart and debuted at #19 on the Weekly Albums Chart with 16,029 copies sold. The album charted for a total of four weeks and sold over 22,000 copies.

Track listing

Charts and sales

References

2006 albums
Aya Ueto albums
Pony Canyon albums